or  was a steam warship of the former navy of the Tokugawa shogunate during the Boshin War of 1868-1869. 

She was later purchased by as a private warship by Akita Domain, one of the feudal domains of the Tokugawa shogunate of Japan, and named Takao Maru. She was armed with four smoothbore cannon on the side, and a powerful Armstrong cannon with explosive shells, installed on a rotating base. 

She participated in the Battle of Miyako Bay, when three Tokugawa Navy warships were dispatched for a surprise attack against Imperial forces. For the battle, Eugene Collache, a French navy officer, was put in command of the Kaiten No.2, on which were sailing 40 seamen and 30 samurai.

The ships encountered bad weather, in which the Kaiten No.2 suffered engine trouble, and the Banryu was separated. The Banryu eventually returned to Hokkaido, without joining the battle. To create surprise, the Kaiten No.1 planned to enter Miyako harbour under an American flag as a ruse de guerre. Unable to achieve more than 3 knots due to engine trouble, the Kaiten No.2 trailed behind, and the Kaiten No.1 first joined battle. The Kaiten No.1 approached the enemy ships and raised the Tokugawa banner seconds before boarding the French-built Kōtetsu, of the opposing Imperial navy (the first Japanese ironclad). The Kōtetsu managed to repel the attack with a Gatling gun, with huge loss on the attacking side. The Kaiten No.1, pursued by the Imperial fleet, steamed out of Miyako Bay just as the Kaiten No.2 was entering it. The Kaiten No.1 eventually escaped to Hokkaido, but the Kaiten No.2 was unable to leave the pursuers and wrecked herself voluntarily. The Kaiten No.2 was set on fire by her escaping crew and exploded.

Collache was imprisoned by the Japanese, judged and condemned to death, but he was finally pardoned. At the end of the conflict, he was sent to Tokyo where he rejoined Jules Brunet, and later left for France.

Notes

References
 Eugène Collache "Une aventure au Japon", in "Le Tour du Monde" No.77, 1874
 USRC Ashuelot, 1863, United States Coast Guard website

Ships of the Tokugawa Navy
1863 ships
Ships built in New York (state)